Carlos Verona Quintanilla (born 4 November 1992) is a Spanish cyclist, who currently rides for UCI WorldTeam . He was named in the start list for the 2016 Giro d'Italia.

Career
Verona was born in San Lorenzo de El Escorial, Madrid. On 30 July 2016,  announced the signing of Verona who would join the team for the remainder of the 2016 season as well as the 2017 and 2018 seasons. In July 2019, he was named in the startlist for the 2019 Tour de France.

Verona claimed his first stage win as a professional in the 2022 Critérium du Dauphiné; on the seventh stage, after being a part of a breakaway initially containing 29 riders, he attacked the group and rode to victory. He was the only rider to finish ahead of General Classification leader Primož Roglič on the stage.

Major results

2009
 3rd Road race, National Junior Road Championships
2010
 2nd Time trial, National Junior Road Championships
 5th Overall Vuelta Al Besaya
2011
 6th Overall Tour des Pays de Savoie
 7th Overall Vuelta a la Comunidad de Madrid Under-23
 7th Overall Cinturó de l'Empordà
2012
 1st  Mountains classification, Vuelta Ciclista a León
 9th Overall Toscana-Terra di Ciclismo
2013
 8th Japan Cup
2015
  Combativity award Stage 10 Vuelta a España
2017
 4th GP Miguel Induráin
 8th Overall Volta a Catalunya
2018
 1st  Mountains classification, Tour of the Basque Country
 1st  Mountains classification, Tour des Fjords
 2nd GP Miguel Induráin
 5th Overall Tour of Guangxi
2019
 5th GP Miguel Induráin
 10th Gran Piemonte
2021
 9th Mont Ventoux Dénivelé Challenge
2022
 1st Stage 7 Critérium du Dauphiné
 6th Overall UAE Tour
 7th Mont Ventoux Dénivelé Challenge
2023
 10th Overall Tour of Oman
 10th Muscat Classic

Grand Tour general classification results timeline

References

External links

1992 births
Living people
Spanish male cyclists
People from San Lorenzo de El Escorial
Cyclists from the Community of Madrid